
In process improvement, a SIPOC (sometimes COPIS) is a tool that summarizes the inputs and outputs of one or more processes in table form. It is used to define a business process from beginning to end before work begins. The acronym SIPOC stands for suppliers, inputs, process, outputs, and customers which form the columns of the table.

History 
It was in use at least as early as the total quality management programs of the late 1980s and continues to be used today in Six Sigma, lean manufacturing, and business process management.

COPIS variant 
To emphasize putting the needs of the customer foremost, the tool is sometimes called COPIS and the process information is filled out in reverse order by starting with the customer and working upstream to the supplier.

Use 
The SIPOC is often presented at the outset of process improvement efforts such as kaizen events or during the "define" phase of the DMAIC process. It has three typical uses depending on the audience:
To give people who are unfamiliar with a process a high-level overview
To reacquaint people whose familiarity with a process has faded or become out-of-date due to process changes
To help people in defining a new process

Aspects 
Several aspects of the SIPOC that may not be readily apparent are:
Suppliers and customers may be internal or external to the organization that performs the process.
Inputs and outputs may be materials, services, or information.
The focus is on capturing the set of inputs and outputs rather than the individual steps in the process.

Mapping 
To create a SIPOC diagram, one must first map the overall process in a few steps. Then one must identify process outputs, who will receive them, and what the necessary inputs and suppliers are for each process. The final step is to share the diagram with the stakeholders to evaluate and verify the results.

Example

See also
 Input-Process-Output (IPO) model
 5 Whys
 Value stream mapping
 IDEF, a functional modelling language

Notes

References

External links
 SIPOC Template
 SIPOC Methodology

Business intelligence terms
Quality control tools
Supply chain management